Sleep with Me is a 1994 American comedy-drama film directed by Rory Kelly and starring Meg Tilly, Eric Stoltz and Craig Sheffer, who play good friends that become involved in a love triangle, a relationship complicated by the marriage of Tilly's and Stoltz's characters.

It also features Parker Posey, Joey Lauren Adams, and a cameo by Quentin Tarantino, in which he expounds on the homoerotic subtext of Top Gun to Todd Field. Six different writers wrote a scene each about the arc and development of the relation between the protagonists, including Kelly.

The film was screened in the Un Certain Regard section at the 1994 Cannes Film Festival. The film was a Gala Presentation at the 1994 Toronto International Film Festival.

Cast
 Meg Tilly as Sarah
 Eric Stoltz as Joseph
 Craig Sheffer as Frank
 Lewis Arquette as Minister
 Todd Field as Duane
 Adrienne Shelly
 Susan Traylor as Deborah
 Tegan West as Rory
 Dean Cameron as Leo
 Amaryllis Borrego as Amy
 Thomas Gibson as Nigel
 Parker Posey as Athena
 Joey Lauren Adams as Lauren
 Alida P. Field as Gina
 Vanessa Angel as Marianne
 June Lockhart as Caroline
 Quentin Tarantino as Sid
 Alexandra Hedison as Brunette Actress

Reception
The film received mostly negative reviews. On Rotten Tomatoes it has a 21% rating, based on 14 reviews.

Despite playing to standing ovations at the 1994 Cannes Film Festival and being surrounded by a great deal of early buzz, the film suffered from distribution issues—namely, that it was acquired by a reorganized MGM and not a specialty division. Consequently it made no more festival appearances, was marketed by MGM as a mainstream romp, and was ignored by most top critics. One of the exceptions was Roger Ebert for the Chicago Sun-Times. who wrote

Year-end lists 
 Honorable mention – David Elliott, The San Diego Union-Tribune

Soundtrack
"Wasted" (Pere Ubu)
"Howl" (Syd Straw)
"E Rockin 'It" (Chucklehead)
"Funk Is on the Loose" (Chucklehead)
"Ab Traffic Jam" (Chucklehead)
"I Live in a Nice House" (Thelonious Monster)
"Big Dumb Song" (Chucklehead)
"Shaken" (Crossed Wire)
"I'm Yours" (Crossed Wire)
"Retrosexy" (Chucklehead)
"Maybe You Should Change Your Name" (El Caminos)
"Tune In, Turn On, Drop Out" (El Caminos)
"I Miss You" (Joey Lauren Adams)
"Daddy's Dead in Momma's Head" (Joey Lauren Adams & Parker Posey)
"Nocturne No. 2, Op. 9, in E-Flat Major" (Peter Schmalfuss)
(Sourced from IMDb)

References

External links
 
 
 

1994 films
1990s romantic comedy-drama films
American romantic comedy-drama films
United Artists films
1994 comedy films
1994 drama films
1990s English-language films
1990s American films